Morgan Davis is a Canadian blues singer, guitarist, and songwriter.

He was born and spent his childhood in Detroit, Michigan, before relocating to Toronto, Ontario, Canada, in 1968. He moved to Halifax, Nova Scotia, in 2001.

His song "Why'd You Lie" was a hit for Colin James and featured on James' 1988 debut album. "Reefer Smokin' Man" was described as a "blues cult classic".  Davis' principal major label release, Morgan Davis, on Stony Plain Records, was produced by Colin Linden.  Davis was the recipient of multiple awards, including a Juno Award, for his 2003 release, Painkiller, on Electro-Fi Records.

Awards

2005 Maple Blues Award, Songwriter of the Year
2004 JUNO Award, Blues Album of the Year: Painkiller
2004 Maple Blues Award, Recording of the Year: Painkiller
2004 Maple Blues Award, Male Vocalist of the Year
2004 Maple Blues Award, SOCAN Songwriter of the Year
2004 Maple Blues Award, Producer of the Year (with Alec Fraser): Painkiller
2000 Toronto Blues Society, Acoustic Artist of the Year
1999 Maple Blues Award, Producer of the Year: Blues Medicine
1999 Maple Blues Award, SOCAN Songwriter of the Year
1996 Toronto Blues Society, Blues with a Feeling Award
1995 Jazz Report, Blues Band of the Year
1994 Jazz Report, Blues Artist of the Year

Discography

2014 I Got My Own (Electro-Fi)
2011 Drive My Blues Away (Electro-Fi)
2007 At Home in Nova Scotia (Deep Cove)
2003 Painkiller (Electro-Fi)
2003 Hogtown Years (Independent)
1999 Blues Medicine (Electro-Fi)
1994 Morgan Davis Live (Independent)
1990 Morgan Davis (Stony Plain)
1982 I'm Ready to Play! (Bullhead)

References

Canadian blues singers
Musicians from Detroit
Musicians from Toronto
Musicians from Halifax, Nova Scotia
Year of birth missing (living people)
Living people
Canadian blues guitarists
Canadian male guitarists
Juno Award for Blues Album of the Year winners